Heidkrug is a railway station located in Delmenhorst, Germany. The station is located on the Oldenburg–Bremen railway. The train services are operated by NordWestBahn. The station has been part of the Bremen S-Bahn since December 2010.

Train services
The following services currently call at the station:

Bremen S-Bahn services  Bad Zwischenahn - Oldenburg - Delmenhorst - Bremen

References

Railway stations in Lower Saxony
Bremen S-Bahn